HMS Exmouth was a 91-gun screw propelled  second-rate ship of the line of the Royal Navy.

Design

Exmouth was ordered as a 90-gun sailing ship from Devonport Dockyard in 1841, but was ordered to be converted to operate under steam propulsion on 30 October 1852.  The conversion began on 20 June 1853 and Exmouth was finally launched on 12 July 1854.  She fitted out at Devonport Dockyard, finally being commissioned for service on 15 March 1855, having cost a total of £146,067, with £76,379 being spent on the hull as a sailing ship, and a further £24,620 spent on the machinery.

Service
In 1855, during the later stages of the Crimean War, she served in the Baltic Sea as flagship of Sir Michael Seymour. On 12 May 1857, Exmouth ran aground in Crewgreace bay, west of The Lizard, Cornwall. She was refloated. Her captain, Harry Ayres was convicted of negligence by a Court Martial and was admonished. Her master, Edward Fancourt Cavell was also convicted. He was sentenced to be reprimanded and admonished. She was a guard ship at Devonport by 1859, when future admiral Robert Spencer Robinson was her captain between 1 February 1858 and May 1859. Exmouth was lent to the Metropolitan Asylums Board to serve as a training ship in 1877. According to a paper read at the Central Poor Law Conference in February 1904 these ships were recommended for boys supervised by the poor law authorities as an economic means of providing them with a career which also benefited the country.
She was sold to George Cohen on 4 April 1905 and then broken up at Penarth.

References

 
 
 Lavery, Brian (2003) The Ship of the Line - Volume 1: The development of the battlefleet 1650-1850. Conway Maritime Press. .
 Lyon, David and Winfield, Rif, The Sail and Steam Navy List, All the Ships of the Royal Navy 1815-1889, pub Chatham, 2004,

External links
 

 

Ships of the line of the Royal Navy
Albion-class ships of the line (1842)
Victorian-era ships of the line of the United Kingdom
1854 ships
Crimean War naval ships of the United Kingdom
Maritime incidents in May 1857